The Nigerian National Assembly delegation from Adamawa comprises three Senators representing Adamawa North, Adamawa Central, and Adamawa South, and eight  Representatives representing   Jada/Ganye/Mayo-Belwa/Toungo, Guyuk/Shelleng, Hong/Gombi, Mubi N/Mu S/Maiha, Fufore/Song, Yola North/Yoal South/Girei, Demsa/Numan/Lamurde, and michika/gulak/Madagali.

Fourth Republic

The 9th Assembly (2019 till date)

The 8th Assembly (2015 till date)

The 7th Assembly (2011-2015)

References
Official Website - National Assembly House of Representatives (Adamawa State)
 Senator List
 Legislators List

Politics of Adamawa State
National Assembly (Nigeria) delegations by state